Rhys Cooyou (born 22 March 1991) is a former professional Australian rules footballer who played for the Greater Western Sydney Giants in the Australian Football League (AFL). He was recruited by the club with the second pick in the 2011 rookie draft. He made his debut in round 22, 2012, against  at Docklands Stadium.

References

External links
Rhys Cooyou's player profile, GWS Giants
 

1991 births
Living people
Greater Western Sydney Giants players
Australian rules footballers from Western Australia
East Fremantle Football Club players
Indigenous Australian players of Australian rules football